Aberfoyle railway station served the village of Aberfoyle in Scotland between 1882 and 1951.

History
The station was opened by the Strathendrick and Aberfoyle Railway on 1 August 1882 as the terminus of a short branch line from Buchlyvie on the Forth and Clyde Junction Railway.

The line was absorbed into the North British Railway, it became part of the London and North Eastern Railway during the Grouping of 1923.

The station was host to a LNER camping coach from 1935 to 1939.

It became part of the Scottish Region of British Railways on nationalisation in 1948.

The line and station closed to passengers on 1 October 1951 and to freight on 5 October 1959.

The site today
The old station is now demolished, replaced by a parking space.

References

Further reading

External links
 Aberfoyle station on navigable O.S. map
 Railscot on the Strathendrick and Aberfoyle Railway

Disused railway stations in Stirling (council area)
Railway stations in Great Britain opened in 1882
Railway stations in Great Britain closed in 1951
Former North British Railway stations
1882 establishments in Scotland
1951 disestablishments in Scotland